The Roman Catholic Diocese of Caxias do Sul is a diocese located in the city of Caxias do Sul in the Ecclesiastical province of Porto Alegre in Brazil.

On Wednesday, 16 June 2010, Pope Benedict XVI appointed Auxiliary Bishop Alessandro Carmelo Ruffinoni, C.S., then the auxiliary bishop to the Archbishop of Porto Alegre, as the Coadjutor Bishop of Caxias do Sul, to succeed Bishop Moretto.

History
 8 September 1934: Established as Diocese of Caxias from Metropolitan Archdiocese of Porto Alegre
 19 October 1966: Renamed as Diocese of Caxias do Sul

Bishops
 Bishops of Caxias do Sul (Roman rite), in reverse chronological order
 Bishop José Gislon, O.F.M. Cap. (2019.06.26 - present)
 Bishop Alessandro Carmelo Ruffinoni (2011.07.06 – 2019.06.26)
 Bishop Nei Paulo Moretto (1983.05.26 – 2011.07.06)
 Bishop Benedito Zorzi (1966.10.19 – 1983.05.26)
 Bishops of Caxias (Roman Rite)
 Bishop Benedito Zorzi (1952.06.24 – 1966.10.19)
 Bishop José Baréa (1935.09.23 – 1951.11.19)

Coadjutor bishops
Nei Paulo Moretto (1976-1983)
Alessandro Carmelo Ruffinoni, C.S. (2010-2011)

Auxiliary bishop
Cândido Julio Bampi, O.F.M. Cap. (1957-1978)

Other priests of this diocese who became bishops
Neri José Tondello, appointed Bishop of Juína, Mato Grosso in 2008
Vital Corbellini, appointed Bishop of Marabá, Para in 2012
Adelar Baruffi, appointed Bishop of Cruz Alta, Rio Grande do Sul in 2014
Leomar Antônio Brustolin, appointed Auxiliary Bishop of Porto Alegre, Rio Grande do Sul Brazil in 2015

References
 GCatholic.org
 Catholic Hierarchy
 Diocese website (Portuguese)

Roman Catholic dioceses in Brazil
Christian organizations established in 1934
Caxias do Sul, Roman Catholic Diocese of
Roman Catholic dioceses and prelatures established in the 20th century
Caxias do Sul